is a song by B'z, released as their twelfth single, on March 17, 1993. This song is one of B'z many number one singles in Oricon chart. The single was re-released in 2003, and re-entered at #5. The single sold over two-million copies according to Oricon. According to Oricon, the song was their best-selling single in Japan. The song won "the best five single award" at the 8th Japan Gold Disc Award. It was released in the best-of album B'z The Best "Pleasure".

The song was used as the theme song for the 1993 Japanese TV drama adaptation of Saiyūki.

Track listing 

Joy

Certifications

References

External links
B'z official website

1993 singles
B'z songs
Oricon Weekly number-one singles
Japanese television drama theme songs
Songs written by Koshi Inaba
Songs written by Tak Matsumoto
1993 songs